Fitzhugh is a given name and surname.

Fitzhugh may also refer to:

 Fitzhugh, Oklahoma, US, a town
 Fitzhugh, Virginia, US, an unincorporated community
 Jasper, Alberta, Canada, originally a railway siding called Fitzhugh
 The Fitzhugh, a weekly newspaper serving the Jasper, Alberta, area
 Baron FitzHugh, a peerage of England
 Gerald Fitzhugh, a fictional character in the Left Behind novels The Regime and The Rapture

See also
 
 Fitz-Hugh–Curtis syndrome